The Best of Gamma is a compilation of music from the first three Gamma albums.

Track listing 

 Mean Streak (Alcivar, Montrose, Pattison) - 4:50 **
 Four Horsemen (Montrose, Pattison) - 4:48 **
 Dirty City (Montrose, Pattison) - 4:04 **
 Voyager (Montrose, Pattison) - 5:23 **
 "Stranger" (Froom, Stahl) - 3:00 ***
 "Condition Yellow" (Carmassi, Froom, Montrose) - 4:08 ***
 "No Way Out" (Froom, Montrose, Stahl) - 4:05 ***
 "Third Degree" (Froom, Montrose, Stahl) - 3:47 ***
 "Thunder & Lightning" (Montrose, Pattison) - 4:37 *
 "I'm Alive" (Clint Ballard Jr.) - 3:18 *
 "Razor King" (Montrose, Pattison) - 5:53 *
 "Modern Girl" (Froom, Montrose) - 3:35 ***
 "Right the First Time" (Froom, Montrose, Stahl) - 3:47 ***
 "Wish I Was" (Mickey Newbury) - 5:16 *
 "What's Gone Is Gone" (Froom, Montrose, Jerry Stahl) - 5:30 ***
 "Fight To The Finish" (Alcivar, Montrose) - 6:25 *

Gamma 1 (1979) - *

Gamma 2 (1980) - **

Gamma 3 (1982) - ***

Personnel
 Ronnie Montrose: Guitar
 Davey Pattison: Vocals
 Jim Alcivar: Keyboards (Gamma 1 & 2)
 Alan Fitzgerald: Bass (Gamma 1)
 Skip Gillette: Drums (Gamma 1)
 Denny Carmassi: Drums (Gamma 2 & 3)
 Glenn Letsch: Bass (Gamma 2 & 3)
 Mitchell Froom: Keyboards (Gamma 3)

Production
Produced by Ken Scott*, Gary Lyons**, Ronnie Montrose** & ***
Engineered by Ken Scott*, Gary Lyons**, Jim Gaines***

References
Gamma; "The Best of Gamma" liner notes; GNP Records 1992
[ All Music Guide]

1992 greatest hits albums
GNP Records albums
Gamma (band) albums